Steele is a surname, and may refer to:

A
 A. W. Steele (1862–1925), American political cartoonist
 Aaron Steele (footballer, born 1983), English football player active in Canada
 Aaron Steele (footballer, born 1987), English football player for Brentford and Slough Town
 Alfred E. Steele, American politician
 Alfred Nu Steele (1901–1959), American businessman and husband of Joan Crawford
 Alfonso Steele, Republic of Texas veteran
 Alison Steele, American radio personality
 Allen Steele, American science fiction author
 Amanda Steele, American video blogger, model, and actress
 Anne Steele (1717–1778), English hymnwriter, essayist

B
 Barbara Steele (born 1937), British actor
 Bobbie L. Steele
 Bobby Steele (born 1956), American punk guitarist
 Brendan Steele (born 1983), American professional golfer

C
 Cassie Steele (born 1989), Canadian actress
 Charles Steele (Royal Air Force officer), British World War I flying ace
 Charles Kenzie Steele (1914–1980), also known as C. K. Steele, American civil rights activist
 Charles Steele Jr. (born 1946), American businessman, politician and civil rights leader
 Charlie Steele, Jr., New Zealand football player
 Charlie Steele, Sr., New Zealand football player
 Chester K. Steele, pseudonym used by the Stratemeyer Syndicate
 Chloe Steele, fictional character in the Left Behind series of novels by Tim LaHaye and Jerry B. Jenkins
 Chris Steele (doctor)
 Chris Steele (musician)
 Christopher Steele (born 1964), British intelligence officer
 Claude Steele

D 
 Dale Steele
 Daphne Steele (1929–2004), Guyanese matron working in England
 Dave Steele (1974–2017), American racecar driver
 David Steele (disambiguation), multiple people
 David Steele (musician) (born 1960), British musician (bassist) of The Beat and Fine Young Cannibals
 Dawn Steele (born 1975), Scottish actress
 Dominic Steele
 Don Steele
 Donald Steele (1892–1962), Australian cricketer and doctor
 Donnie Steele
 Doug Steele, Saskatchewan politician
 Duane Steele, Canadian country singer

E
 Elijah Steele (1817–1883), American politician
 Elmer Steele (1886–1966), American baseball player
 Eric Steele (born 1954), English football player and coach
 Esther Baker Steele (1835-1911), American educator, author, editor, philanthropist

F
 Frederick Steele, Union general during the American Civil War
 Fletcher Steele (1885–1971), American landscape architect
 Florence Harriet Steele (1857–1948), British artist
 Franklin Steele, American storekeeper at Fort Snelling, the first to claim land at St. Anthony Falls in 1838
 Freddie Steele, American boxer
 Freddie Steele (footballer) (1916–1976), English footballer and football manager

G
 George Steele
 Gile Steele
 George Washington Steele
 Gordon Charles Steele, Royal Navy captain
 Guy L. Steele Jr., American computer scientist and author

H
 Harold R. Steele
Helen Steele
 Henry Joseph Steele

J
 J. M. Steele, author
 Jack Steele (soccer)
 Jack Steele, AFL player
 Jack E. Steele
 Jadrien Steele, actor
 Jason Steele (disambiguation), multiple people
 Jeffrey Steele
 Jeffrey Steele (artist)
 Jahna Steele
 James Steele (disambiguation), multiple people
 Jevetta Steele
 Jim Steele (footballer)
 Jimmy Steele (republican)
 Joel Dorman Steele, educator and author
 Johannes Steele
 John Steele (physician), Irish-American Mormon pioneer and doctor
 John Steele (paratrooper)
 John Steele (North Carolina politician)
 John Hardy Steele, 19th Governor of New Hampshire
 John Yellow Bird Steele, seven term president of the Oglala Sioux Tribe
 Jonathan Steele (disambiguation)
 Joseph Steele (born 1881), Canadian politician and carpenter
 Joseph H. Steele (1836–1913), American politician and businessman
 Joshua Steele, British linguist of the 18th century
 Josh Steel, British basketball player
 Joshua Steele, English dubstep musician known as Flux Pavilion
 Joyce Steele
 Justin Steele, American baseball player

K
 Karen Steele
 Kevin Steele

L

 Larry Steele
 Lee Steele
 Leslie Jasper Steele (1868–1929), American politician
 Lexington Steele
 Luke Steele (disambiguation), multiple people

M
 Markus Steele
 Martin Steele
 Mary Steele
 Michael Steele, musician
 Michael Steele (born 1958), American politician
 Michelle Steele

P
 Paul Steele, Canadian rower
 Peter Steele (1962–2010), stage name of American musician Peter Ratajczyk

R 
 Ray Steele (disambiguation), multiple people
 Rayford Steele
 Raymond Steele (1917–1993), Australian rules footballer with Richmond 1940–1943
 Richard Steele (disambiguation), multiple people
 Riley Steele (born 1987), American pornographic actress
 Robert Steele (1791-1879), Scottish shipbuilder
 Robert H. Steele
 Robert Williamson Steele (1820–1901), Governor of the Territory of Jefferson
 Ronald Steele
 Rowena Granice Steele (1824–1901), American performer and publisher
 Ryan Steele (disambiguation), multiple people

S
 Sam Steele (1849–1919), Canadian military and law enforcement officer; namesake of Mount Steele
 Samantha Steele, American sportscaster
 Selena Steele, member of the Adult Video News Hall of Fame
 Shelby Steele, conservative African-American social commentator
 Susan J. Swift Steele (1822–1895), American social reformer
 Sydnee Steele

T
 Terence Steele (born 1997), American football player
 Thomas Steele (disambiguation), multiple people
 Timothy Steele
 Tom Steele (politician), Scottish Labour politician
 Tom Steele (stuntman), Scottish-born stuntman and actor
 Tommy Steele (born 1936), stage name of British entertainer Thomas Hicks
 Tyler Steele, character from the TV series VR Troopers

V
 Valerie Steele

W
 Walter Leak Steele
 William Steele (disambiguation), multiple people

See also
 el Steele (wrestler)
 Steele (given name)
 Steele (disambiguation)

English-language surnames